Dole Manor is a manor house on Dole Island in the Daugava River, in the historical region of Vidzeme, in central Latvia, not far from Riga.

History
The first owner of the estate was Swedish army Colonel Nikolauss Deetrih Sperreuter in 1631. The current manor was built in 1898 in Neo-Romantic style. After 1921 it housed a primary school, after 1954 a fishermen's club. Since 1977 the Daugava River Museum has been located in the manor house.

See also
List of palaces and manor houses in Latvia

References

External links
  Dole Manor
  About the Daugava Museum
 

Manor houses in Latvia
Salaspils Municipality